Segre is a  Jewish-Italian surname. Notable people with the surname include:

Beniamino Segre (1903–1977), Italian geometer
Corrado Segre (1863–1924), Italian geometer
Guido Segre[ it ] (1881-19456), Jewish Italian entrepreneur and member of the Fascist Party
Emilio G. Segrè (1905–1989), Italian American physicist
Liliana Segre (1930-), Italian holocaust survivor and senator for life
Luigi Segre (1919–1963), Italian automobile designer

Jewish surnames
Italian-language surnames